Nazma Akhtar is a Bangladesh Awami League politician and the former Member of Parliament from a reserved seat. She was born 01 February 1988 in Dhaka.

Career
Akhtar was elected to parliament from reserved seat as a Bangladesh Awami League candidate in 2009. She is the founder President of Bangladesh Awami Jubo Mohila League.

References

Awami League politicians
Living people
Women members of the Jatiya Sangsad
9th Jatiya Sangsad members
21st-century Bangladeshi women politicians
21st-century Bangladeshi politicians
Year of birth missing (living people)